Hyun Woo (born Kim Hyun-woo on January 18, 1985) is a South Korean actor. He is best known for his roles in the television series Pasta and the sitcom Living Among the Rich.

In 2009, he, Lee Jang-woo and No Min-woo formed the K-pop project group 24/7, which released the single 24 Hours a Day, 7 Days a Week, then disbanded soon after. Hyun Woo also hosted Music Bank from 2010 to 2011.

Filmography

Television series

Film

Variety show

Musical theatre

Awards and nominations

References

External links
 Hyun Woo at Glorious Entertainment 
 
 

1985 births
Living people
21st-century South Korean male actors
IHQ (company) artists
South Korean male television actors
South Korean male film actors
South Korean male musical theatre actors
South Korean male models
South Korean male singers
South Korean pop singers